Maxon Group is a Swiss manufacturer and supplier of high-precision motor systems. The group, including its subsidiaries, offers electric DC motors, AC motors, encoders (sensors), gears, and electric motor controllers.

History
On December 5, 1961, Interelectric AG was founded. After the factory building in Sachseln had been completed in 1963, Interelectric began producing shearing foils for electric razors of Braun GmbH. At the time, there were 17 employees. The basis of the company was a technical process called galvanoplasty or electroforming. Soon afterwards, a separate development department for electromechanical devices was created. In 1967, Braun GmbH was sold to Gillette. Following up on the work on DC motors that had been carried out in the company's own R&D department, the engineers were able to develop an entire range of models of DC motors. At the same time, the engineers in Sachseln patented the manufacturing process for the ironless rotor with the diamond-shaped winding. In 1970, the DC Motors were registered under the trademark 'Maxon'. In 1999, the company restructured and rebranded as Maxon Motor AG. In 2012, the company started offering DC motor drive configuration tooling through its website. In 2017 zub motion control AG, based in the city of Lucerne, Switzerland, was acquired by the company. Parvalux Electric Motors Ltd based in Bournemouth, UK, was acquired by Maxon Motor AG in 2018. Together with customers, the company increasingly develops complete mechatronics, consisting of a motor, gearhead, sensors, controller, batteries, and software. These are available in standard or unique build. In July 2019, the company re-branded simply as 'Maxon'.

Products
The company developed and patented its own ironless winding system. Its motors are available as either brushless, or brushed with graphite brushes or precious metal brushes. A section of its brushless DC motor program is available as flat (pancake) build for use in restricted space envelopes. The types of gearheads available are spur gearheads and planetary gearheads made of plastic, ceramic (zirconium dioxide and aluminium oxide) or stainless steel. The company mainly supplies combination drive units to suit high-precision applications. Accompanying the core business of electric motors, the group also offers a range of position encoders and two programs of motor control electronics. With the acquisition of Parvalux, AC motors are now offered by the group via this subsidiary.

Application areas
The company specializes in customer specific drives. It produces more than 5 million drive units per year in approx. 12'000 variations. Its main market areas are medical technology, industrial automation, security technology, measuring and testing technology, communication technology, automotive and aerospace technology.

Maxon became known to a broader public when its products were chosen by the NASA for the Mars rover projects Sojourner, Spirit,  Opportunity and Perseverance.

Locations
Maxon has its headquarters, along with a production plant, in Sachseln, in the Swiss Canton of Obwalden. The company gives its name to the railway station, Ewil Maxon, which adjoins the plant and has frequent connections to the city of Lucerne and farther.

Besides its Sachseln plant, Maxon has production facilities at Sexau in Germany, Veszprém in Hungary, Cheonan in South Korea and Taunton, MA, United States of America. Sales operations exist in Switzerland, Germany, United Kingdom, United States of America, Australia, Spain, Italy, Benelux, India, Japan, Mainland China, Taiwan and South Korea, and sales agents in numerous other countries.

References

Manufacturing companies of Switzerland